Claire Louise Perry O'Neill ( Richens; born 3 April 1964) is a British businesswoman and former politician who is the managing director for climate and energy at the World Business Council for Sustainable Development, having previously served as Minister of State for Energy and Clean Growth from 2017 to 2019. Formerly a member of the Conservative Party, she was Member of Parliament (MP) for Devizes in Wiltshire from 2010 to 2019.

Early life
Claire Louise Richens was born in Bromsgrove, Worcestershire, and brought up in North Somerset. She is the youngest of three children of David and Joanne Richens. She was educated at Nailsea School in Somerset and Brasenose College, Oxford, where she read geography, graduating in 1985. 

One of her contemporaries at Brasenose was George Monbiot, who described her in his column for The Guardian as at the time "a firebrand who wanted to nationalise the banks and overthrow capitalism". She later earned an MBA at Harvard University. Following graduation, she worked for Bank of America, McKinsey & Company and Credit Suisse.

Parliamentary career
After joining the Conservative Party in 2006, Perry worked for Shadow Chancellor George Osborne. She was selected in November 2009 as a Conservative candidate after Michael Ancram announced his intention to stand down from Devizes, a safe seat for her party. In her maiden speech she was critical of the previous Labour government's management of the rural economy, adding: "we do not get as many jobcentres per head of the population in rural Britain". She also paid tribute to the Armed Forces, as Devizes is home to 11,000 soldiers.

In October 2011, Perry was appointed as Parliamentary Private Secretary to Philip Hammond, the Secretary of State for Defence. She held this role until October 2013, when she became a Government Assistant Whip. On 15 July 2014, Perry was appointed Parliamentary Under-Secretary of State for Transport, with responsibility for rail fares, rail franchising, freight and logistics and transport agencies. She resigned from this position on 14 July 2016, at the time of the reshuffle, when Theresa May became Prime Minister, the day after saying in a debate she was "often ashamed to be the Rail Minister".

Perry campaigned for improvements in online safety, and in 2011 led an Independent Parliamentary Inquiry into Online Child Protection, with a particular focus on online pornography. She was subsequently appointed by the Prime Minister, David Cameron, as an adviser on preventing the sexualisation and commercialisation of children.

Perry argued for blocks on pornography for all internet users unless they opt out of it, citing the need to protect children. In July 2013, hackers placed pornographic images on Perry's own website. Perry accused political blogger Paul Staines – known for his Guido Fawkes blog – of sponsoring the attack, while Staines threatened to sue her for libel if the claim was not removed. After Internet filters started to be rolled out, news agencies reported that a wide range of non-pornographic websites were now being censored by UK ISPs as a result of false-positive results for blocked phrases, including Perry's own website, as a result of her frequent use of words such as "porn" and "sex" in web posts about her pro-censorship campaign.

In October 2012, Perry mistakenly stated that the national debt and national deficit were the same thing in a discussion on BBC Radio 5 Live.

In September 2014, she mentioned a possible revival of the women-only carriages during a speech to a fringe event at the Conservative Party conference.

Perry campaigned for the UK to remain in the EU during the 2016 membership referendum, and argued after the vote that some members of her party were "like jihadis" in their support for a "hard Brexit" and said the tone of the debate on leaving the European Union "borders on the hysterical". She was one of only seven Conservative MPs to vote for an amendment arguing that Parliament should have the final say on any deal to leave the EU. She subsequently voted with her party in approving the decision to invoke Article 50.

Perry was appointed as Minister of State for Energy and Clean Growth at the Department for Business, Energy and Industrial Strategy by Theresa May in the her second ministry, after the June 2017 reshuffle. During the January 2018 cabinet reshuffle, she was given the right to attend Cabinet.

In September 2019, Perry announced she would not stand at the next general election, which in the event took place in December of that year.

In November 2018 the PCS, FDA and Prospect unions raised concerns with senior officials at the Department of Business, Energy and Industrial Strategy that Perry had been accused of swearing and shouting at staff. The shadow Cabinet Office minister Jon Trickett said that the unions had raised "serious allegations" and urged officials to "look into them carefully".

The Daily Telegraph reported in May 2019 that she was claiming £9,843 per year tax-free in Parliamentary expenses for her three children, aged  17, 19 and 22 the two eldest of whom were at university, on top of her salary as MP and Minister of State for Energy totalling £111,148 and her standard tax-free "second home allowance" of £22,760. She did not deny the report, but said that she had not broken any Parliamentary rules.

Post-Parliament career

Climate Change Conference 
In September 2019, Perry was nominated as President of the 26th United Nations Climate Change Conference, to be held in Glasgow in November 2020. In the same month, she announced that she would not stand for re-election to Parliament, and she then gave up her seat in the general election of December 2019. She was succeeded as Conservative MP for Devizes by Danny Kruger.

The UK government abruptly removed Perry from the Presidential post on 31 January 2020, stating that the post would become "a ministerial role". She later criticised actions of the prime minister's adviser Dominic Cummings, saying he "put out a deeply defamatory briefing to the media the day he fired me, claiming that the COP didn’t need a President".

WBCSD 
In September 2020, Perry was appointed managing director for climate and energy at the World Business Council for Sustainable Development, a membership organisation for companies, which works on a variety of issues related to sustainable development.

Political allegiance 
In January 2023, Perry announced that she had resigned from the Conservative Party despite saying that she admired the Prime Minister, Rishi Sunak, and his Chancellor, Jeremy Hunt. 

Perry claimed that the Conservative Party had become dominated by “ideology and self-obsession” and explained that Britain's strained relations with the European Union were also behind her decision to quit. Perry praised Keir Starmer and backed him to provide “sober, fact-driven, competent political leadership”.

Personal life
Perry has three children from her former marriage. Three months after she announced her separation, it was reported that Perry had begun a relationship with Professor Bill O'Neill, a researcher and lecturer on lasers, whom she had met through constituency work; Perry and O'Neill married in 2018. Perry lives in Pewsey Vale in Wiltshire.

Notes

References

External links

1964 births
Living people
People from North Somerset (district)
Alumni of Brasenose College, Oxford
Anti-pornography activists
English bankers
Conservative Party (UK) MPs for English constituencies
UK MPs 2010–2015
UK MPs 2015–2017
UK MPs 2017–2019
Female members of the Parliament of the United Kingdom for English constituencies
Harvard Business School alumni
21st-century British women politicians
Female members of the Cabinet of the United Kingdom
Members of the Privy Council of the United Kingdom
Members of the Parliament of the United Kingdom for constituencies in Wiltshire
21st-century English women
21st-century English people